Michel Blanc (born 16 April 1952) is a French actor, writer and director.  He is noted for his roles of losers and hypochondriacs.  He is frequently associated with Le Splendid, which he co-founded, along with Thierry Lhermitte, Josiane Balasko, Christian Clavier, Marie-Anne Chazel and Gérard Jugnot.
Michel Blanc has also shown his versatility by appearing in more serious roles, such as the title role in the Patrice Leconte film Monsieur Hire.

He is one of the few people to have won awards at the Cannes Film Festival in both a creative and performing role, winning the Male Acting Prize in 1986 and the Best Screenplay Prize in 1994.

On stage

As an actor

As a director

Filmography

As an actor

As a director

References

External links

 

1952 births
Living people
French male film actors
French film directors
French male screenwriters
French screenwriters
Lycée Pasteur (Neuilly-sur-Seine) alumni
20th-century French male actors
21st-century French male actors
French male television actors
Best Supporting Actor César Award winners
Cannes Film Festival Award for Best Actor winners
Cannes Film Festival Award for Best Screenplay winners